The Blasters are a fictional DC Comics team of superhumans who first appeared in the miniseries Invasion! #1 by Keith Giffen, Bill Mantlo and Todd McFarlane.  Blasters Special #1 (March 1989) was produced by the creative team of Peter David and James Fry.

Fictional team history
Fifty humans from around the world were abducted by the Dominators and their allies, these humans were placed in a special Blaster Field arena full of horrifying high tech weapons and land mines in order to test for the possibility of a metagene. Of the fifty test subjects, only six survived. The six tested positive for superhuman abilities, and a unique genetic marker that High Caste Dominator scientists would later dub the "Metagene".

This proved to the Dominators that humanity was a threat, and that Earth and its people were too dangerous to remain free.  Thus the Dominators joined the Thanagarians, Psions, and others in the Alien Alliance.

Starlag
The six survivors were locked away on the prison world known as Starlag. In time, they discovered that their fellow prisoners were the legendary Omega Men from the Vega system, and the super genius Vril Dox of Colu as well as other future members of L.E.G.I.O.N. Working together they overthrow the Starlag guards and hijack an independent shuttle piloted by Churljenkins, a feline alien female. En route to Earth, their shuttle encounters a superhuman task force headed for the Dominator homeworld in order to find a cure for the Dominators' gene bomb. The two groups combined, and the six humans now nicknamed The Blasters help end the invasion. The Blasters were then returned to Earth by the Omega Men in Churljenkins' ship.

Blasters
Each human had trouble adjusting to their new powers; Fritz Klein (Frag) had to take tranquilizers to maintain his temper so that he would not spontaneously combust. Children taunted Moshe Levy (Dust Devil) for pretending to have super-powers. Carlotta (Jolt) was slowly going mad trying to control her repulsion field. Snapper is placed in a mental institution; he had kept his eyes open during a transport and had gone mad as a result.

Later, Snapper escapes from the asylum by teleporting directly to Churljenkins' ship. It had broken down on a tiny alien world. The two "steal" the ship from the Omega Men leaving them stranded there. The two intend to go to Churl's to home. They discover that her home planet had been destroyed to make a spaceway to Earth for the Alliance. Returning to Earth, Snapper and Churljenkins discover a secret Spider Guild weapons depot. Snapper re-unites the Blasters and the team puts an end to the Guild's operation. They also alert the Justice League to its existence.

Starlag II
The team decides to stay united and travel the spaceways as goodwill ambassadors, in order to repair Earth's reputation among the galactic community. After wandering for a while, the Blasters later began to question the wisdom of their decision. Just when they were about to disband and return to Earth, they received a distress call from Babbage, Valor's digital assistant. Valor was wrongly imprisoned in Starlag II by its warden Kanjar Ru, sister of Kanjar Ro. When the team broke into Starlag II, they unintentionally released the being known as the Unimaginable. The Unimaginable then set forces in motion which threatened to destroy Starlag II. The Blasters were trapped as the prison began crumbling. Their fate following this incident remains a mystery.

The Unimaginable's next appearance would be on Earth in the pages of Supermen of America #5 by Fabian Nicieza.

Lost
At some point after this, Snapper Carr is separated from his teammates. He did not know if they were dead or alive and expresses guilt over their unknown fate. While searching for them, he is captured by some Khunds, who cut off his hands. He is rescued by operatives of L.E.G.I.O.N., but knew nothing about the fates of his fellow Blasters. Vril Dox gives Snapper new hands, but he had now lost the ability to teleport. Snapper is then returned to Earth, as seen in Hourman #20-21.

Membership
Snapper Carr - The former Justice League mascot, now with the power to teleport whenever he snapped his fingers.
Churljenkins – A catlike green furred alien and space pilot, who became Snapper Carr's girlfriend.
Jolt - Carlotta Rivera, a fashion model from Madrid, Spain. She could generate a gravimagnetic field that repelled anything near her skin, even water and oxygen.
Looking Glass - Dexter Fairfax, a British writer of children's books, from the town of Tunbridge Wells, England. He could transform his torso into a flat plane of living reflective and super-refractive glass.
Dust Devil - Moshe Levy, a young student from Tel Aviv, Israel. He could generate a funnel of fast moving air, a miniature tornado.
Frag - Fritz Klein, a ski instructor based in Innsbruck, Austria. He could become living metal and fire explosive blasts.
Crackpot - Amos Monroe, a self-professed African-American con artist from New Orleans, United States.  If he remained calm, he could cause people to believe nearly anything.

Supporting characters
Gunther - A renegade Dominator scientist.
Ms. Levy - Dust Devil's overprotective mother.

Bibliography
Invasion #1-3 (1989)
Blasters Special #1
Valor #5-8
Hourman #20-21

Notes
 The Blasters were supposedly a pet project of Robert Loring Fleming. Fleming brought the Blasters in as guests when he took over the Valor series. He was later forced to leave them in limbo, as the Zero Hour plans for the Legion soon overshadowed the book.

References

External links
Cosmic Teams: Blasters
DCU Guide: Blasters
DCU Guide: Snapper Carr
DCU Guide: Invasion #1

DC Comics titles
DC Comics metahumans
Comics characters introduced in 1989